Picture Day can refer to:

 Picture Day (school day), the day students are photographed
 Picture Day (film), a 2012 film
 "Picture Day" (Dexter's Lab), the 1st segment of the 32nd episode of Dexter's Laboratory
 "Picture Day" (SpongeBob SquarePants), a Season 5 episode of SpongeBob SquarePants